Ganja International Hospital opened in September, 2015 in Ganja, Azerbaijan. It consists of 5 floors, with an area of 11,887 m2.

Facilities and services 
Outpatient and stationary departments serve in the hospital. The polyclinic section consists of 25 cabinets, stationary sections (5 junior suit, 4 suit, 2 VIP) 38 single beds, 12 multi-bed patient rooms. There are 27 medical departments and over 50 doctors work in the hospital. Every department of the hospital is supplied with modern equipment.

Staff 
There are more than 300 employees in the hospital. 55 of them are doctors. More than 150 pen heart operations done by Cardio vascular  Surgeons in the Ganja International Hospital.

Check-up center 
There is a check-up center in Ganja International Hospital, every patient can check-up generally or one organ of the body.

Emergency department 
The hospital features 24 hours emergency services, including 2 ambulances and 1 reanimobile ready for transporting of patients and getting first aid.

Infection Control 
Infection Control Commission controls regularly for acting medical services in the completed sterile conditions.
57 cameras were installed for the security of Hospital. Affable and experienced security personnel  serves 24 hours. Water sprinkler fire suppression system, 8 emergency exit and trained personal minimized the risk of damage and loss of human life during the fire.

References 

 Joint Commission International official site
 Article in haqqin.az
 Article in vesti.az/news/279946
 Article in news.day.az

Buildings and structures in Ganja, Azerbaijan
Hospitals in Azerbaijan
Hospitals established in 2015